Flood the Tanks is an album by the Northern Irish singer songwriter, Iain Archer.  The album was originally released in 2004, but was later re-packaged and re-released on a different label in 2005. The songs "Running in Dreams " and "Boy Boy Boy" were released as singles.

Track listing

In the 2005 version of the album, Mirrorball Moon is not hidden. Instead, I Wasn't Drinkin' But You Got Me Drunk is hidden.

References

2004 albums
Iain Archer albums